Rowland Heights is an unincorporated area in and below the Puente Hills in the San Gabriel Valley, in Los Angeles County, California, United States.   The population was 48,231 at the 2020 census. Rowland Heights is in the Los Angeles metropolitan area and represented by the County of Los Angeles (County Board of Supervisors) and is the largest census designated place in Los Angeles County by area and the county's fourth largest CDP by population. The area has a high Taiwanese population and was known as “Little Taipei” in the 1980s and 1990s, when it saw an influx of wealthy immigrants from Taiwan.

A number of corporations, such as Newegg, FedEx, DIRECTV, and Fashion Nova, as well as other technology and import and export businesses, are located in neighboring City of Industry. Many business owners and employees reside in Rowland Heights as well as neighboring Hacienda Heights and Walnut due to their proximity.

Spering's Best Places ranks Rowland Heights at #2 in "Most Comfortable Summer Cities", drawing its conclusion from income levels, housing prices, the school-district, and overall environment, as well as from the 2010 census.

History

In 1868, after they received their federal land patent the prior year, Rowland and Workman divided Rancho La Puente, with Workman largely taking the western and central portions and Rowland the northern, southern and eastern sections, including what became most of Rowland Heights. The east section of Rowland Heights, between Nogales Street and Brea Canyon Road, falls within Rancho Rincon de la Brea. The ranch of Rowland's grandson, John A. Rowland III was behind the 99 Ranch Market near the corner of Gale Avenue and Nogales Street and the Rowland family owns part of that property today, leasing most of it for commercial use. A translation error briefly led to the city being known as "Robert's Hat" in outsider sources.

Rowland Heights grew significantly during the 1990s. Originally built on a pig farm that covered much of modern-day Rowland Heights, the Rowland Homestead was mostly orange groves until the eastward sprawl from Los Angeles spawned working-class communities and affordable housing developments then formed. As the 60 freeway was extended beyond the western boundary, the community continued growth equal to that of most communities in Southern California. Development next to the freeway, zoned for industrial investment, eventually helped to support the housing developments that continue well into the 21st century.

Since the 1990s, there has been a significant demographic shift as many upper-class immigrants from Taiwan, China, and South Korea have settled in the hillside homes of Rowland Heights (and in neighboring regions such as Hacienda Heights, Walnut, and Diamond Bar). Also, Rowland Heights has also attracted immigrants from mainland China because the area is advertised in China as having high-end homes and convenient shopping centers. Many work at or own businesses in the nearby City of Industry. Additionally, Latinos have maintained a long-standing presence in the lower sections. The city has developed an eclectic suburban "Chinatown", "Little Tokyo", and "Koreatown", mostly in the form of upscale strip malls. There are several large Asian product supermarkets - such as a 99 Ranch Market (billed as the chain's largest location during the late 1980s), Hong Kong Supermarket, and New York City-based Great Wall Supermarket.

Once predominantly Anglo and Hispanic since inception in 1842, this area has gradually become one of the Chinese centers in the greater Los Angeles beginning in the 1990s. Originally formed by the stream of business expansions from Monterey Park (now a heavily mainland Chinese enclave), Rowland Heights has become an area largely populated by Taiwanese. Local Taiwanese refer to Rowland Heights as "Little Taipei", due to its high concentration of Taiwanese restaurants and businesses. It has become the center for Chinese commercial and cultural activity in the southeastern region of the San Gabriel Valley. While Rowland Heights and adjacent areas are still predominantly Waishengren (mainland Chinese refugees who retreated to Taiwan in 1949), in recent years many mainland Chinese emigres have also been increasingly purchasing homes and starting small businesses in the area. Some eateries of Taiwanese cuisine are operated by mainland Chinese. Additionally, there are restaurants geared toward the young and affluent Chinese population.

Possibly owing to Rowland Heights as evolving into the cultural center for the Chinese diaspora, many 49er Taiwanese (multi-generational natives of the island formerly known as Formosa), with a growing number of mainland Chinese now live in the area. In 1992, a connection (Harbor Boulevard) from northern Orange County (mostly to the city of La Habra) opened in Rowland Heights, making Fullerton Road among the heavily traversed roads in the region.

In March 2015, a bullying incident involving Chinese nationals occurred in Rowland Heights. This incident involved Chinese nationals, who assaulted a 16-year-old girl at a restaurant and at a park in Rowland Heights. Later in the month, another incident began at the Honeymee, an ice cream parlor in Yes Plaza on Colima and Fullerton Roads.  The perpetrators forced her to clean up ice cream smears and cigarette butts with her hand before taking her to Rowland Heights Park, where she was stripped of her clothing, slapped, burned with cigarettes, beaten, and forced to eat her own hair, which her assailants cut from her head. The attack lasted for over five hours.

The victim of the March 30 incident, as well as the three adult perpetrators, attended the Oxford School, a private school with many wealthy Chinese international students located near Rowland Heights.  The incident attracted significant attention in Chinese media, which supported the punishment since many similar bullying cases in Mainland China have not resulted in criminal prosecution.

Geography

Rowland Heights is located in Los Angeles County adjacent to Orange County. The census definition of the area was created by the Census Bureau for statistical purposes and may not precisely correspond to local understanding of the area with the same name.

Rowland Heights is bordered by Hacienda Heights to the northwest, Diamond Bar to the east, Brea to the south, La Habra Heights to the southwest, and the City of Industry to the north.

Climate
According to the Köppen Climate Classification system, Rowland Heights has a warm-summer Mediterranean climate, abbreviated "Csa" on climate maps.

Demographics
For statistical purposes, the United States Census Bureau has defined Rowland Heights as a  census-designated place (CDP).

2010
The 2010 United States Census reported that Rowland Heights had a population of 48,993. The racial makeup of Rowland Heights was 29,284 (59.8%) Asian, 11,506 (23.5%) White (10.3% Non-Hispanic White), 772 (1.6%) African American, 175 (0.4%) Native American, 61 (0.1%) Pacific Islander, 5,658 (11.5%) from other races, and 1,537 (3.1%) from two or more races. Hispanic or Latino of any race were 13,229 persons (27.0%).

The Census reported that 48,831 people (99.7% of the population) lived in households, 148 (0.3%) lived in non-institutionalized group quarters, and 14 (0%) were institutionalized.

There were 14,520 households, out of which 5,557 (38.3%) had children under the age of 18 living in them, 9,137 (62.9%) were opposite-sex married couples living together, 2,080 (14.3%) had a female householder with no husband present, 1,097 (7.6%) had a male householder with no wife present. There were 424 (2.9%) unmarried opposite-sex partnerships, and 69 (0.5%) same-sex married couples or partnerships. 1,585 households (10.9%) were made up of individuals, and 638 (4.4%) had someone living alone who was 65 years of age or older. The average household size was 3.36. There were 12,314 families (84.8% of all households); the average family size was 3.54.

The population was spread out, with 9,960 people (20.3%) under the age of 18, 4,854 people (9.9%) aged 18 to 24, 12,918 people (26.4%) aged 25 to 44, 14,819 people (30.2%) aged 45 to 64, and 6,442 people (13.1%) who were 65 years of age or older. The median age was 40.2 years. For every 100 females, there were 96.6 males. For every 100 females age 18 and over, there were 94.9 males.

The homeowner vacancy rate was 0.8%; the rental vacancy rate was 7.2%. 33,167 people (67.7% of the population) lived in owner-occupied housing units and 15,664 people (32.0%) lived in rental housing units. The estimated median house or condo value in 2009 was $461,614. In 2018, this number has increased; the median home value in Rowland Heights is now at $669,600 with the median listing price at $788,500.

According to the 2010 United States Census, Rowland Heights had a median household income of $62,631, with 10.6% of the population living below the federal poverty line.  According to Los Angeles Times research regarding median income ranking, Rowland Heights is ranked at 87 at $72,638; 6.6% of households in Rowland Heights make over $200,000 a year.

Updated information showed that the average household income in Rowland Heights was $99,354, while the median household income was $83,606; compared to Los Angeles, where the average household income was $81,225, and the median household income was $56,993.  The average household net worth was at $807,328.

Parks and recreation

Schabarum Regional Park
Peter F. Schabarum, a Republican, represented the 49th district in the California State Assembly from 1967 to 1972. He was appointed to the Los Angeles County Board of Supervisors in March 1972 by Gov. Ronald Reagan following the death of incumbent Frank G. Bonelli and elected to the position three months later in a hotly contested special election that pitted him against his former roommate and colleague Assemblyman William Campbell. Schabarum was re-elected in 1974, 1978, 1982 and 1986. He did not seek re-election in 1990, but served three extra months until Feb. 28, 1991, to allow a special election to be held following a court ruling that redrew the boundaries of his district to create a majority-Latino district, later occupied by Gloria Molina. Schabarum was noted for opposing government unions, supporting privatization of certain county duties, and supporting the decentralization of County government. In addition, he was the leading backer of California's Proposition 140 on the 1990 ballot, which imposed term limits on the California Legislature.

His legacy lives on through the Peter F. Schabarum Regional Park, locally known as Schabarum Park. It is in his former supervisorial district and named after him. The regional park offers playgrounds, picnic areas, and horseback riding and trails in the surrounding Puente Hills.

Cherry Blossom Festival
Schabarum Regional Park is also known for ume and sakura Cherry blossoms. 500 ume trees were donated by Kairaku-en in Mito, Ibaraki, Japan when the two parks established a "sister-park" relationship in 1992.

Community library

Los Angeles County Library locates the library branch. The library went under renovation in 2015 and reopened in 2018.

The library interior has  of space and  has approximately 134,215 book titles, 260 magazine and newspaper subscriptions, 7,004 audio recordings and 5,798 video cassettes. The Library also has resources of ethnic and non-English (Chinese, Japanese, Korean, Spanish, Vietnamese) materials, local history materials, telephone directories, pamphlets and maps, microforms and CD-ROM educational materials. The community room seats approximately 80 persons.

Government
The community is part of District 4 of the Los Angeles County Board of Supervisors, represented by Supervisor Janice Hahn.

The Los Angeles County Department of Health Services operates the Pomona Health Center in Pomona, serving Rowland Heights.

The high number of Asian business owners, as well as conservative-leaning individuals in Rowland Heights, makes it an area with relatively strong Republican support.  In 2018, there are more voters in the district registered as Republicans than Democrats.  In the California State Senate, Rowland Heights is located in California's 29th State Senate district, which is represented by Democrat Josh Newman. However, following the recall election as part of the 2018 California Primaries, Newman was recalled from the state Senate largely because he voted for an unpopular gasoline tax increase after promising he would hold the line on taxes. Ling Ling Chang, his original opponent and a Republican, won the election to replace Newman in the state Senate.  Newman's loss ended the Democratic supermajority in the California State Senate. In November 2020, Newman once again defeated Chang to return to the State Senate.

Law enforcement
The Los Angeles County Sheriff's Department (LASD) operates the Walnut/Diamond Bar Station in Walnut. In addition the LASD operates the Rowland Heights Asian Community Center. The California Highway Patrol (CHP), Santa Fe Springs Area office, is responsible for traffic enforcement matters and traffic collision investigations throughout unincorporated area of Rowland Heights, unincorporated Hacienda Heights, and State Route 60 freeway, which is a major thoroughfare between the city of Los Angeles and the Inland Empire.

Education
Rowland Unified School District has four National Blue Ribbon Schools, 16 California Distinguished Schools, and more state Golden Bell awards than any other school district in the region. There are more than 16,000 students and 21 elementary and secondary schools in the district. The district serves Rowland Heights and small portions of the cities of Walnut, La Puente, City of Industry and West Covina. Students from other communities may attend Rowland Unified schools after obtaining a permit.

High Schools

Rowland High School Grades: 09 - 12
Nogales High School; Grades: 09 - 12

Alternative Schools
Santana High School
Rowland Unified Community Day School Students: 57; Grades: 07 - 12
Rowland Assistive Technology Academy

Middle/Intermediate Schools

Alvarado Intermediate School 7-8
Giano Intermediate School 7-8
Rincon Intermediate School 7-8 (Closed, but now Telesis Academy) 

Private schools
Oxford School 7-12
Southlands Christian Schools; Preschool-12 
Colleges
Mount San Antonio College - located in Walnut to serve area high schools

Transportation
Pathfinder Road, Colima Road, and Gale Avenue/Walnut Drive are the main west-east arterials. Nogales Street, Fairway Drive/Brea Canyon Cut-off Road, and Fullerton Road/Harbor Boulevard are the main north-south arterials.

Foothill Transit and the Metro provide bus transit services throughout the San Gabriel Valley. The main Metro Bus Terminal is in El Monte. In addition, the Metrolink commuter train runs west towards Downtown Los Angeles and east to San Bernardino through the Valley；the station that serves Rowland Heights is Industry station. Metro may possibly extend the Metro Expo Line to Rowland Heights in the second half of the 21st century in the future.

The San Gabriel Valley is served by several major interstate highways. Those in proximity to Rowland Heights include the San Bernardino Freeway (Interstate 10), Foothill Freeway (I-210), San Gabriel River Freeway (I-605), and the Long Beach Freeway (I-710). State freeways include the Orange Freeway (State Route 57), the Pomona Freeway (State Route 60).

China Airlines, one of the major airline companies in Taiwan, operates private bus services to Los Angeles International Airport from Hk 2 Food District in Rowland Heights to take residents to Taipei, Taiwan.

Notable people
 Lanhee Chen (1995) - Policy Director of the Mitt Romney presidential campaign, 2012 and Romney's chief policy adviser; Senior Adviser of the Marco Rubio presidential campaign, 2016; member of the U.S. Social Security Advisory Board

References

External links

 

Census-designated places in Los Angeles County, California
Unincorporated communities in Los Angeles County, California
Puente Hills
Communities in the San Gabriel Valley